Charang is the name of several rural localities in the Sakha Republic, Russia:

Charang, Khangalassky District, Sakha Republic, a selo in Bestyakhsky Rural Okrug of Khangalassky District
Charang, Ust-Aldansky District, Sakha Republic, a selo in Khorinsky 1-y Rural Okrug of Ust-Aldansky District

Charang is also the name of a General MIDI instrument.